Astoria Canyon is a submarine canyon 10 miles (16 km) offshore from the mouth of the Columbia River.

See also

 Astoria Fan

External links
 https://web.archive.org/web/20050902223250/http://newport.pmel.noaa.gov/heceta/oceanexploration.htm

Geography of the Pacific Northwest
Submarine canyons of the Pacific Ocean